Rasoul Mir Malek (born 31 October 1938) is an Iranian wrestler. He competed in the men's Greco-Roman featherweight at the 1964 Summer Olympics.

References

External links
 

1938 births
Living people
Iranian male sport wrestlers
Olympic wrestlers of Iran
Wrestlers at the 1964 Summer Olympics
Place of birth missing (living people)